{{DISPLAYTITLE:C11H14FNO}}
The molecular formula C11H14FNO (molar mass: 195.233 g/mol, exact mass: 195.1059 u) may refer to:

 4-Fluoroethcathinone (4-FEC)
 3-Fluorophenmetrazine (3-FPM)

Molecular formulas